Hypsirhynchus ferox, the Hispaniolan hog-nosed racer or Hispaniola cat-eyed snake, is a species of snake in the family Colubridae.  The species is native to Haiti and the Dominican Republic.

References

Hypsirhynchus
Reptiles of Haiti
Reptiles of the Dominican Republic
Taxa named by Albert Günther
Reptiles described in 1858